The Orbison Way is the 8th album recorded by Roy Orbison, and his second for MGM Records, released in January 1966. Two singles were taken from the album — "Crawling Back" and "Breakin' Up Is Breakin' My Heart", both of which were chart hits in England, the US and Australia. The album charted at #11 in the UK and #128 in the US.

Cash Box described "Crawling Back" as a "tender, slow-moving, laconic ode about a love-sick fella who’ll go to any lengths to get his ex-gal back again."  Cash Box described "Breakin' Up Is Breakin' My Heart" as a "medium-paced, full orked and chorus backed soulful tearjerker about a lonely guy who’s been singing the blues since his gal jilted him."

Track listing
All tracks composed by Roy Orbison and Bill Dees, except where indicated.
Five of their songs feature his band, The Candy Men

Personnel
Produced by Wesley Rose & Jim Vienneau 
Arranged by Bill McElhiney
Bill Malloy - engineer
Val Valentin - director of engineering
Ace Lehman - cover design

References

Roy Orbison albums
1966 albums
Albums produced by Wesley Rose
MGM Records albums